This period in the history of Middlesbrough is considered its most traumatic. The club was in financial difficulties which eventually led to liquidation in 1986 and the near loss of professional football on Teesside. At the end of 1985–86 season Boro were relegated to the old Third Division. By then Willie Maddren was no longer manager. He was sacked with 13 games remaining, replaced by his assistant Bruce Rioch. Maddren is remembered for his astute signings. Bernie Slaven was signed from part-time football in Scotland to become a Middlesbrough legend. Maddren also brought youth team players through the ranks, including Colin Cooper and Stuart Ripley.

August 1985 – Don O'Riordan's  performances for Carlisle United earned himself a £55,000 move to Middlesbrough in August 1985. Despite missing only one game the following season, O'Riordan was released amidst Middlesbrough's financial crisis.

30 August 1985 – Newcastle United midfielder Pat Heard moves to Middlesbrough on a month's loan with a view to a permanent deal.

October 1985 – In a trial game against Bradford City, Bernie Slaven scored and impressed the Middlesbrough management enough to snap him up. Bradford boss Terry Yorath also wanted him to sign on the dotted line, but the then Albion Rovers owner negotiated a deal with Middlesbrough which satisfied all parties and manager Willie Maddren picked Slaven up for a bargain price of £25,000.

22 October 1985 – Home team Sunderland beat ten man Middlesbrough 1-0 after Archie Stephens was sent off in the 33rd minute.

November 1985 - Middlesbrough beat Shrewsbury Town 3-1, in front of a home gate of 4,061, with goals from Gary Rowell, Pat Heard and Tony McAndrew.<ref>The Yorkshire Post, 'Action Replay - 30 years ago today 27 November 2015</ref>

2 January 1986 – Second Division strugglers Middlesbrough are reported to be £1 million in debt.

21 May 1986 – Middlesbrough, recently relegated to the Third Division for the second time in their history, are faced with the threat of losing their Football League status and going out of business after going into liquidation.

 Senior squadThe following are all the players who were involved the Middlesbrough F.C. first team at some point during the 1985-86 season.''

Second Division

See also
1986–87 Middlesbrough F.C. season

References

1985-86
English football clubs 1985–86 season